Campeche is one of the 13 municipalities in the Mexican state of Campeche. The municipal seat, and largest settlement, is the city of San Francisco de Campeche (often shortened to Campeche).

Demographics
As of 2010, the municipality had a total population of 259,005.

The municipality had 565 localities, the largest of which (with 2010 populations in parentheses) were: San Francisco de Campeche (220,389), Lerma (8,281), Chiná (5,194), classified as urban, and Los Laureles (2,251), Alfredo V. Bonfil (2,060), Pich (1,756), Tikinmul (1,663), Imí (1,227), Hampolol (1,123), Castamay (1,101), and San Francisco Kobén (1,045), classified as rural.

See also
 List of presidents of Campeche Municipality

References

Municipalities of Campeche